Maya Manithan is a 1958 Indian Tamil language science fiction film produced and directed by T. P. Sundaram. The film stars Sriram, S. A. Asokan, and Chandrakantha.

Cast & Crew 
Adapted from Film credits.

Cast 

Sriram
C. D. Vanaja
S. A. Ashokan
Maithili
G. M. Basheer
Chandrakantha
Kaka Radhakrishnan
T. P. Muthulakshmi
K. Kannan
Kandhala Devi
Master Vijayakumar
Pathangudi
N. S. Subbaiah
Samikannu
Gajakarnam
Rajamani
Joseph
Raja
M. R. L. Narayan

Dance
Helen (Kannukkulle Minnalaadudhu)
Sukumari
Bala
Jeeva
Malathi

Crew 
Producer: T. P. Sundaram & Harilal Badeviya
Director: T. P. Sundaram
Screenplay & Dialogues: A. S. Muthu
Cinematography: M. Krishnaswamy
Audiography: T. S. Rangasamy, Kanniappan & Mohanasundaram (songs)
Nageswaran and Narasimman (dialogues)
Choreography: R. Krishnaraj, Chopra (Helen dance)
Art: C. Ramaraju
Photography: R. N. Nagaraja Rao
Studio & Lab: Golden Cine Studio
Processing: Krishnan
Stunt: Somu & Party

Soundtrack 
Music was composed by G. Govindarajulu Naidu while the lyrics were penned by A. Maruthakasi. Playback Singers are: Jikki, P. Susheela, S. Janaki, T. V. Rathnam, A. G. Rathnamala, A. L. Raghavan, S. V. Ponnusamy, S. C. Krishnan.

References

External links 

Indian science fiction films
Films about invisibility
1950s Tamil-language films
1950s science fiction films